Muthanna Governorate ( Al Muthannā) or Al Muthanna Province, is a province in Iraq, named after the 7th-century Arab general al-Muthanna ibn Haritha. It is in the south of the country, bordering Saudi Arabia And Kuwait. Its capital is the city of Samawah.

History
Before 1976 it was part of the Diwaniya Province, which included present-day Najaf Governorate and al-Qādisiyyah Governorate.

Samawah is very close to the ancient Sumerian-Babylonian city of Uruk (Aramaic: Erech), which is possibly the source of the name Iraq. After the decline of Babylon following the Seleucid founding of Seleucia, Uruk became the largest city in southern Babylonia, and its name (Erech) came to replace Babili (Babylonia), as the city long outlived the former capital, surviving into the 7th century AD.

In February 1991 it was the location of one of the largest tank battles in history during the Persian Gulf War, the Battle of Norfolk.

Demographics

Provincial government
Governor: Mohammed Ali Al-Hassani
Deputy Governor: Sami Al-Hassani
Chairman of Al-Muthanna Provincial Council: Abdul Latif Al-Hassani

References 

 
Governorates of Iraq